Petula is a female given name of only occasional usage but well known on account of British entertainer Petula Clark.

Petula may also refer to:
Namesakes
Petula Louise "Patty" Brard, Dutch-Indonesian entertainer
Dawn Petula Butler, British Labour Party politician
Fictional characters
Petula, lead character played by Rachel Weisz in the 2000 film Beautiful Creatures
Petula, a sheep character in the cartoon show Littlest Pet Shop: A World of Our Own
Petula, character played by Hayley McFarland in three episodes of the Showtime dramedy United States of Tara
Petula, Disney comic character being the sister of Pete and hostess of the cooking show Petula's Pantry
Petula, lead character and iconic image for the Molly Moon series of children's novels by Georgia Byng, being the title character's pet pug
Petula Giordino, character played by Julie Walters in the BBC One sitcom dinnerladies
Petula Lorry, one-shot character in the DC comic series Batman, being featured in Issue 287 (May 1977)
Petula the Parrot, African parrot in the Belgian cartoon series 64 Zoo Lane
Miss Petula Perpetual-Motion, character in the book World's Worst Children by David Walliams
In music
Petula, 1968 album release by Petula Clark
"It's Up to You, Petula", 1971 single by Edison Lighthouse

English feminine given names